Chris Führich (born 9 January 1998) is a German professional footballer who plays as a midfielder for Bundesliga club VfB Stuttgart.

Career

VfB Stuttgart 
Führich signed a four-year contract with VfB Stuttgart on 19 July 2021. He scored Stuttgart's first goal in a 2–2 draw with FC Bayern München on 10 September 2022.

References

External links

 
 

1998 births
Living people
People from Castrop-Rauxel
Sportspeople from Münster (region)
German footballers
Footballers from North Rhine-Westphalia
Association football midfielders
Bundesliga players
2. Bundesliga players
Regionalliga players
1. FC Köln II players
1. FC Köln players
Borussia Dortmund II players
SC Paderborn 07 players
VfB Stuttgart players